Susan Richardson may refer to:

 Susan Richardson, American actress (1952-)
 Susan Richardson (swimmer), competitive English swimmer (1955-)
 Susan D. Richardson, American chemist
 Susan Richardson (Underground Railroad), an escaped slave and church co-founder (1810-1904)
 Susan Smith Richardson, American journalist and editor